Thomas Patrick McGuire (February 1, 1892 – December 7, 1959) was a pitcher in Major League Baseball. He played for four different professional teams in Chicago from 1912 to 1919.

External links

1892 births
1959 deaths
Major League Baseball pitchers
Chicago Whales players
Chicago White Sox players
Chicago Green Sox players
Chicago Keeleys players
Baseball players from Chicago